The 4728th Air Defense Group  is a discontinued United States Air Force organization. Its last assignment was with the New York Air Defense Sector at Dover Air Force Base.

The group was formed to provide a single command and support organization for the two fighter interceptor squadrons of Air Defense Command (ADC), that were tenants at Dover, a Military Air Transport Service (MATS) base.  It was also assigned a maintenance squadron to perform aircraft maintenance.  It was discontinued after the 46th Fighter-Interceptor Squadron inactivated in 1958, leaving only a single fighter squadron at Griffiss.

History
The 4728th Air Defense Group was organized in early 1957.  The group was established to provide a headquarters for Air Defense Command (ADC) Fighter-Interceptor Squadrons (FIS) stationed at Dover Air Force Base, Delaware, a Military Air Transport Service base, whose 1607th Air Base Group acted as the host base organization. It was assigned the 46th FIS, flying Lockheed F-94 Starfire aircraft, armed with Mighty Mouse rockets. and the 98th FIS, flying Northrop F-89 Scorpion aircraft, armed with both Mighty Mouse rockets and AIM-4 Falcons as its operational squadrons. Both aircraft had a radar officer to operate the aircraft airborne intercept radar.  The group mission was air defense of the Middle Atlantic Area of the United States.  These squadrons were already stationed at Dover and had been assigned to the New York Air Defense Sector.

In August, maintenance for the two squadrons was combined in the 604th Consolidated Aircraft Maintenance Squadron (CAMS), which was activated at Dover. The 98th FIS converted to newer model F-89s, which could carry nuclear armed AIR-2 Genies, in the fall of 1957. The group was discontinued when the 46th FIS was inactivated, leaving only a single operational ADC squadron at Dover. The 604th CAMS was also inactivated, while the 98th FIS was then assigned directly to the New York Air Defense Sector.

Lineage
 Designated and organized as the 4728th Air Defense Group on 8 February 1957
 Discontinued on 1 July 1958

Assignments
 New York Air Defense Sector, 8 February 1957 – 1 July 1958

Stations
 Dover Air Force Base, Delaware, 8 February 1957 – 1 July 1958

Components
 46th Fighter-Interceptor Squadron, 8 February 1957 – 1 July 1958
 98th Fighter-Interceptor Squadron, 8 February 1957 – 1 July 1958
 604th Consolidated Aircraft Maintenance Squadron, 8 August 1957 – 1 July 1958

Aircraft
 Northrop F-89H Scorpion, 1957
 Northrop F-89J Scorpion, 1957–1958
 Lockheed F-94C Starfire, 1957–1958

See also
 F-89 Scorpion units of the United States Air Force
 F-94 Starfire units of the United States Air Force
 List of United States Air Force Aerospace Defense Command Interceptor Squadrons

References

Notes

Bibliography

Further reading
 

Air defense groups of the United States Air Force
Four digit groups of the United States Air Force
Aerospace Defense Command units
Military units and formations established in 1957
Military units and formations disestablished in 1958
Military units and formations in Delaware